This is a list of flag bearers who have competed as individual Olympic athletes at the Olympics.

Flag bearers carry the Olympic Flag at the opening ceremony of the Olympic Games.

List

Notes

References

See also
Independent Olympians at the Olympic Games

Flag bearers, List
Independent Olympians